Liangdang County is a county under the administration of Longnan City, in the southeast of Gansu Province of China. The postal code is 742400. The county seat is located in Chengguan Town. In 2017 it was the poorest county in Gansu.

Liangdang is best known in China for the April 1932 Liangdang Uprising, launched by Xi Zhongxun.

Administrative divisions
Liangdang County is divided to 6 towns and 6 townships.
Towns 
 Chengguan

-Towns are upgraded from Township.

Townships

Climate

References

 
County-level divisions of Gansu
Longnan